

Heinrich Liebe (29 January 1908 – 27 July 1997) was a German naval officer during World War II. He served as a U-boat commander.

Awards
 Wehrmacht Long Service Award 4th Class (2 October 1936)
 Olympic Games Decoration (20 April 1937)
 Iron Cross (1939) 2nd Class (8 October 1939) & 1st Class (6 April 1940)
 U-boat War Badge (1939) (16 December 1939)
 Knight's Cross of the Iron Cross with Oak Leaves
 Knight's Cross on 14 August 1940 as Kapitänleutnant and commander of U-38
 13th Oak Leaves on 10 June 1941 as Kapitänleutnant and commander of U-38
 Italian War Cross with Swords (2 December 1941)
 War Merit Cross 2nd Class with Swords (3 September 1944)

References

Citations

Bibliography

 
 

1908 births
1997 deaths
People from Saxe-Coburg and Gotha
People from Gotha (town)
U-boat commanders (Kriegsmarine)
Recipients of the Knight's Cross of the Iron Cross with Oak Leaves
Recipients of the War Cross for Military Valor
Reichsmarine personnel
Military personnel from Thuringia